Henry Burk (September 26, 1850 – December 5, 1903) was a Republican member of the U.S. House of Representatives from Pennsylvania and Philadelphia businessman.

Private life

Henry Burk was born in Knittlingen, Württemberg, Germany, son of David and Charlotte Reinman Burk; Henry was the fourth child of eight. David, a shoemaker, made the decision to leave Germany because of unacceptable political views. The family emigrated to the United States in 1854 and settled in Philadelphia, Pennsylvania. Henry attended school only a few years, but then began to work to help his family; he was reputed to have a natural engineering ability. He became a repairer of shoemaking machinery and subsequently engaged in supplying this machinery to the trade. He was engaged in the manufacture of leather and in 1887 invented the alum and sumac tawing process, which revolutionized the tanning industry. The company he founded with his two brothers Alfred E. Burk and Charles D. Burk, Burk Brothers and Company, is now listed as a Registered Historic Place. He also helped to establish a meat packing company in Philadelphia with the same brothers and two others, William and Louis; this company was known variously as Burk Meats and Louis Burk & Co. ("Burk's Franks" were known throughout the Delaware Valley well into the 1950s).   He became president of the Manufacturers’ National Association in 1895. He travelled around the world for his leather business, from Europe—visiting his birthplace in 1894—to India.

Family

Burk married Ellen Carney (1851–1914) on August 18, 1873, in Philadelphia; they had six children: Mary, Charles Henry, Henry Jr., Helen, Gertrude, and Charlotte.  Burk was grandfather to character actor Henry Jones (1912–1999), and great-grandfather to actress Jocelyn Jones.

Congress
Burk was elected in 1901 as a Republican to the 57th Congress and served from March 4, 1901, until his death in Philadelphia.

During the time that Burk served in Congress, the Boer War was raging in South Africa. Burk supported the Boers against the British. However, the United States sold the British preserved meat and hay, as well as mules and other supplies. Burk moved in the House that "mules, remounts, and other supplies be declared contraband", but by this time the war was practically over.

He died on December 5, 1903 and was interred at Holy Sepulchre Cemetery in Cheltenham Township, Pennsylvania.

See also
 List of United States Congress members who died in office (1900–49)

References

External links
 
 Henry Burk, late a representative from Pennsylvania, Memorial addresses delivered in the House of Representatives and Senate frontispiece 1905

1850 births
1903 deaths
Burials at Holy Sepulchre Cemetery
German emigrants to the United States
Tanners
Republican Party members of the United States House of Representatives from Pennsylvania
19th-century American politicians